Seven Is a Jolly Good Time is an Egg compilation album released by See For Miles Records in 1985. It consists of  the band’s debut album, Egg (1970), and their earlier (and only) single, “Seven Is A Jolly Good Time”/”You Are All Princes”, released 1969.

The album has not been remastered; rather, the single A- and B-side tracks have been added to the band's first album Egg as bonus material.

Track listing

Side one
 "Bulb" – 0:09
 "While Growing My Hair" – 3:53
 "I Will Be Absorbed" – 5:10
 "Fugue In D Minor" – 2:46
 "They Laughed When I sat Down At The Piano…" – 1:17
 "The Song Of McGuillicudie The Pusillanimous (or don't worry James, your socks are hanging in the coal cellar with Thomas)” – 5:07
 "Boilk" – 1:00
 "You Are All Princes" - 3:46

Side two
 "Symphony No. 2"
Movement 1 – 5:47
Movement 2 – 6:20
Blane – 8:42
Movement 4 – 4:51
 "Seven Is A Jolly Good Time" - 2:45

Personnel
 Dave Stewart – organ, piano, tone generator
 Mont Campbell – bass, vocals
 Clive Brooks – drums

References

External links
 

Egg (band) albums
1985 compilation albums